Events from the year 1792 in Russia

Incumbents
 Monarch – Catherine II

Events

  Russo-Turkish War (1787–92)
 9 January - Treaty of Jassy ends war

 Polish–Russian War of 1792
 26 May - Battle of Opsa
 11 June - Battle of Mir
 14 June - Battle of Boruszkowce
 18 June - Battle of Zieleńce
 18 July - Battle of Dubienka

Births
 Nikolai Lobachevsky (1792-1856) - mathematician
 Mikhail Pavlov (1792-1840) - academic, textbook writer
 Grand Duchess Olga Pavlovna of Russia (1792-1795) - daughter of Paul I of Russia
 Lev Perovski (1792-1856) - nobleman, administrator, and mineralogist
 Pyotr Pletnyov (1792-1866) - poet, literary critic, academic
 Natasha Rostova (b. 1792) - character in War and Peace
 Zinaida Volkonskaya (1792-1862) - writer, poet, composer, singer, salonist, and lady-in-waiting
 Pyotr Vyazemsky (1792-1878) - poet
 Alexander Ypsilantis (1792-1828) - Greek who rose to be a Russian major general

Deaths
 George Browne (1698-1792) - Irishman who became a Russian general and governor of Livonia
 Denis Fonvizin (1745-1792) - playwright of the Russian Enlightenment
 Gavriil Skorodumov (1755-1792) - engraver
 Mikhail Sushkov (1778-1792) - writer, suicide
 Elizaveta Vorontsova (1739-1792) - mistress of Peter III of Russia

References

1792 in Russia
Years of the 18th century in the Russian Empire